CredibleMeds is an online database launched in 2009  of  information regarding serious drug-drug interactions associated with QT prolongation or the potentially lethal arrhythmia, torsades de pointes (TdP). It also assists with measurement of the quality of healthcare delivery for the Centers for Medicare and Medicaid Services, and aids in the management of patients with inherited channelopathies.

The overall goal of CredibleMeds is to support efforts to improve the safe use of medicines.

History
The Arizona Center for Education and Research on Therapeutics (AZCERT) maintains the CredibleMeds database. 
Founded in 2000 at the University of Arizona as part of a network of 14 federally-funded CERTs, AZCERT became a separate non-profit corporation in 2012 funded by the US Food and Drug Administration (FDA), research grants, and charitable contributions. 
AZCERT focuses on drugs and drug–drug interactions, especially those that cause QT prolongation and Torsades de Pointes (TdP) arrhythmia, and provides its research and its lists of drugs free of charge to the public, healthcare providers, and researchers for personal, professional, and non-commercial purposes. To maintain the independence of its work, AZCERT does not receive funding from companies that have a commercial interest in medications.

Adverse drug event analysis
AZCERT developed the Adverse Drug Event Causality Analysis (ADECA) to evaluate drugs for their risk of causing QT prolongation and TdP. As part of its ADECA reviews, AZCERT includes drugs marketed outside the United States, especially in Europe, Japan, and Canada. In addition to their use to inform healthcare decision making, CredibleMeds’ lists of drugs have been used in research published in more than 50 scientific articles.

References

External links
 ARIZONA CERT (Center for Education and Research on Therapeutics)
 Centers for Education & Research on Therapeutics (CERTs)
 Credible Meds
 Institute for Safe Medication Practices (ISMP)
 Pharmacy Quality Alliance (PQA)
 Sudden Arrhythmia Death Syndromes Foundation (SADS)
 U.S. Food and Drug Administration (FDA)
 U.S. Pharmacopeial Convention (USP)

Online databases
American medical websites
Internet properties established in 2009